The ISPS Handa Championship in Spain was a professional golf tournament that was held 21–24 April 2022 at Infinitum Golf in Tarragona, Spain.

The tournament was created as a one-off event after the ISPS Handa Championship in Japan was removed from the schedule in February 2022. It was played the week before the Catalunya Championship; another one-off event which was created to replace the postponed Volvo China Open.

Pablo Larrazábal won the event, shooting a final-round 62, beating Adrián Otaegui by one shot.

Winners

References

External links
Event page on the official site of the European Tour

Former European Tour events
Golf tournaments in Spain
Sport in Tarragona
2022 establishments in Spain